A list of films produced in Italy in 1986 (see 1986 in film):

References

Footnotes

Sources

External links
Italian films of 1986 at the Internet Movie Database

1986
Italina
Films